Martin Daniel Eakes is an American economic development strategist, and credit union CEO.

Eakes grew up in Greensboro, North Carolina and graduated from Davidson College, where he majored in physics and philosophy, and holds a J.D. from Yale Law School and an M.P.P. from the Woodrow Wilson School of Public and International Affairs at Princeton University.

In 1980, he co-founded the Center for Community Self-Help in Durham. Self-Help provides consumer financial services technical support and advocacy for those left out of the economic mainstream. The nonprofit is headquartered in Durham, North Carolina and has offices in South Carolina, Florida, Washington, D.C.,  California, Illinois and Wisconsin. Through Self-Help's Center for Responsible Lending, Eakes has advocated for fair lending practices and sound economic policies.

In 1998, he helped form the Center for Responsible Lending.

Boards
Eakes is a Trustee of the Ford Foundation and a member of its Education, Creativity and Free Expression Committee.
Eakes is a Trustee of Guilford College in Greensboro, North Carolina. He also serves on its national Board of Advisors for the Center for Principled Problem Solving.

Personal
He is married to Barbara Marie Wright; they have two children, Justin and Carlyn.

Awards
 1996 MacArthur Fellows Program
 Ford Foundation grant
 2009 Ned Gramlich Lifetime Achievement Award for Responsible Lending.
 2009 AARP Inspire Awards Honoree
 2011 Ford Foundation Visionaries Award for his contributions to creating financial opportunities for the poor
 2013 Hubert H. Humphrey Civil and Human Rights Award from The Leadership Conference on Civil and Human Rights
 2015 James Madison Medal from the Association of Princeton Graduate Alumni (APGA)

References

Living people
Businesspeople from Greensboro, North Carolina
Davidson College alumni
Yale Law School alumni
Princeton School of Public and International Affairs alumni
MacArthur Fellows
Year of birth missing (living people)
American chief executives of financial services companies